Payung is a district of South Bangka Regency, Bangka-Belitung Islands. It is located in the northern part of the regency, bordering the Central Bangka Regency.

Administrative divisions
The district is subdivided into nine villages. The administrative center is located at Payung village.

Economy
The economy of the district is largely agricultural, with the labor force nearly entirely engaged in agriculture.

References

Populated places in the Bangka Belitung Islands
Districts of South Bangka Regency